Jonathan Simon Williams (born 1960) is a Welsh Anglican priest: since 2012 he has been Archdeacon of Newport.

Williams was educated at the University of Wales and the College of the Resurrection, Mirfield. He was ordained in 1987 and began his career with a curacies at Gelligaer and Cwmbran. He held incumbencies at Marshfield, and Bassaleg. He was collated archdeacon on 9 September 2012. As well as being Archdeacon he is also Precentor of St Woolo's Cathedral.

References

1960 births
20th-century Welsh Anglican priests
21st-century Welsh Anglican priests
Living people
Archdeacons of Newport